Mount Baker is a mountain (1,480 m) in the southeast part of Gabbro Hills near the edge of the Ross Ice Shelf, standing at the west side of Gough Glacier, 6 nautical miles (11 km) east of Amphibole Peak. Discovered by the U.S. Ross Ice Shelf Traverse Party (1957-58) under A.P. Crary, and named for Gladys E. Baker, who assisted in analyzing, classifying and reporting upon lichens for the Byrd Antarctic Expedition (1933-35).

Reference

Baker, Mount